Karfanj (also Romanized as Karfenj; also known as Karfanj Bālā, Karfanj-e Bālā, and Karfanj-e ‘Olyā) is a village in Jayezan Rural District, Jayezan District, Omidiyeh County, Khuzestan Province, Iran. At the 2006 census, its population was 176, in 35 families.

References 

Populated places in Omidiyeh County